Sins of the Mother may refer to:

Sins of the Mother (1991 TV film), a TV film directed by John Patterson, starring Elizabeth Montgomery, Dale Midkiff and Heather Fairfield
"Sins of the Mother" (Birds of Prey), a 2002 episode of an American television series Birds of Prey
Sins of the Mother (2010 TV film), a Lifetime Movie Network original film starring Jill Scott

See also
The Sins of the Mothers (1914), film directed by Ralph Ince starring Anita Stewart, Julia Swayne Gordon, and Ralph Ince
Sins of the Father (disambiguation)